The House of Riste and Blaže Melovski is a historical house in Galičnik that is listed as Cultural heritage of North Macedonia. It is in ownership of the two branches of the family of Melovski.

History

Notable members of the family 
Jovan Meloski - teacher and principal of the Galičnik school. His house, located south-east of this house, is also listed as Cultural heritage of North Macedonia.

See also
House of Kuze Frčkovski
House of Mane Šulevski
House of Petre and Mile Želčevski
House of Velimir Gjinovski
House of Mitre Gjozinski and Velimir Čangovski
House of Gjorgje Karanovski
House of Gjorgji Pulevski

References

External links
 National Register of objects that are cultural heritage (List updated to December 31, 2012) (In Macedonian)
 Office for Protection of Cultural Heritage (In Macedonian)

Galičnik
Cultural heritage of North Macedonia
Historic houses